Nitzer Ebb is a British EBM group formed in 1982 by Essex school friends Vaughan "Bon" Harris (programming, synthesizers, drums, vocals), Douglas McCarthy (vocals), and David Gooday (drums).

History

Initial releases (1983–1987) 
The group released their demo Basic Pain Procedure in 1983, but it was two years until they met PWL producer Phil Harding, who produced their 1985 debut single "Isn't It Funny How Your Body Works?" and helped them set up their own label, Power Of Voice Communications. The band at the time was inspired by the post-punk scene and specifically acts like "Siouxsie and the Banshees, Killing Joke and Bauhaus who were having a big influence on us, in some ways stylistically but also in the energy that they gave".

They released three more singles on their own label, "Warsaw Ghetto" (1985), "Warsaw Ghetto Remixes" (1986) and "Let Your Body Learn" (1986), before signing to Mute Records in 1986. The singles "Murderous" (1986) and "Let Your Body Learn" (1987) followed, building their reputation in the Industrial Rock and EBM scenes, as well as making inroads into the developing Chicago House scene.

"Join In The Chant" (1987) became part of the Balearic beat scene that influenced the UK acid house scene.

International success, disbandment (1987–1995)
Their debut album That Total Age was released in 1987. Depeche Mode, longtime friends and label mates of the band, invited them to open for the European leg of their successful Music For The Masses Tour in 1987. 

David Gooday left after the tour and they completed their next album Belief (1989) as a duo. Mark 'Flood' Ellis became their new producer. They recruited Julian Beeston to assist them on their own world tour, and he soon became a regular contributor both on and off stage.

In 1989, they teamed with German EBM pioneers Die Krupps to rerecord their 1981 single "Wahre Arbeit - Wahrer Lohn" as "The Machineries of Joy".

The third Nitzer Ebb album Showtime, released in 1990, revealed a less confrontational sound. The single "Fun to Be Had" (1990) featured a remix by George Clinton and was a hit on the US dance chart. 

Their fourth album, Ebbhead (1991), showcased a more traditional songwriting style with an emphasis on melodic choruses was produced by Alan Wilder from Depeche Mode and Flood. They promoted the album with a global tour that took them from the southern U.S. to northern Siberia (in the Siberian city of Barnaul).

Their fifth album ,Big Hit (1995), featured a greater use of 'real' instruments, especially guitars and drums. McCarthy and Harris recruited Jason Payne (percussion), to their main line-up and brought in John Napier (guitar, percussion) to assist with live performances.

Big Hit was the final release by the band for almost 15 years. McCarthy was a regular collaborator with Alan Wilder's Recoil project, and he records with French electronic producer Terence Fixmer as Fixmer/McCarthy. Bon Harris moved to Los Angeles, where he became a successful producer and recorded as 13mg and as a member of Maven.

Reunion (2006–present)

Nitzer Ebb began work on new material in Los Angeles in early 2007, with a retrospective documentary still in the pipeline. During 2007, Nitzer Ebb continued its trend of replacing drummers as Kourtney Klein left the band to be replaced by Jason Payne. A first track, "Once You Say," with Depeche Mode songwriter Martin L. Gore on backing vocals, was played in June 2007 by Dave Clarke in his White Noise show on VPRO's 3 Voor 12. This track, along with "Payroll," were debuted live as Nitzer Ebb played a handful of shows and festivals during 2007. These tracks were then featured on Nitzer Ebb's album, Industrial Complex.

McCarthy and Harris reunited up with Jason Payne and producer Flood to finish up the first new Nitzer Ebb record in over a decade. In the meantime, Fixmer/McCarthy released its second album in June 2008, Into the Night.

The band announced a US tour for fall–winter 2009 and were selected as the opening act of the January and February European and Russian dates of Depeche Mode's Tour of the Universe in 2010.

In 2019, the band announced a North American tour that included the original band members David Gooday and Simon Granger. In 2021, the band continued more tour dates including in Europe.

During the COVID-19 pandemic, Harris and McCarthy got together to work on a side project called D-R-A-G.

In November 2021, McCarthy collapsed before a show in Palm Beach, Florida and had to go to the hospital. The band emphasized it was due to complications from a pre-existing illness and it had nothing to do with COVID-19. The band went on to perform with Harris on lead vocals.

Influences and legacy
The single "Murderous" has been sampled by other electronic music acts, such as Information Society (on "Now That I Have You") and Kode IV (on "Success"). Nitzer Ebb's early tracks also made inroads to techno culture, notably in Richie Hawtin's  1999 DJ mix, Decks, EFX & 909.

Band members

Members
 Bon Harris – programming, synthesizers, drums, vocals, bass (1982–present)
 Douglas McCarthy – vocals, guitars (1982–present)
 David Gooday – vocals, drums (1982–1987, 2019–present)
Simon Granger – writing, arrangement and artwork (1983–1995, 2019–present)

Former members
 Duc Nhan Nguyen – drums (1987–1988)
 Julian Beeston – drums (1989–1992)
Jason Payne – drums (1992–1995, 2007–2019)

Touring members
 David Lovering – drums (1994–1995)
 John Napier – guitars, percussion (1995)
 Kourtney Klein – drums (2006–2007)

Discography

Studio albums and EPs

Soundtracks
 Saw IV "Payroll (John O Mix)" (2007)
 Grand Theft Auto IV "Let Your Body Learn" (2008)
 NCIS "Promises" (2009)
 Saw VI "Never Known" (2009)
 Saw VII "Promises" (2010)
 Castle "Kiss Kiss Bang Bang" (2010)
 Tony Hawk: Ride (video game) "Kiss Kiss Bang Bang" (2010)
 The Following "Murderous" (2013)

Singles

B-sides and non-album tracks

Music videos
 Murderous (1987)
 Let Your Body Learn (1987)
 Control I'm Here (1988)
 Hearts and Minds (1989)
 Shame (1989)
 The Machineries of Joy (1989)
 Lightning Man (1990)
 Fun to Be Had (1990)
 Family Man (1991)
 I Give to You (1991)
 Godhead (1992)
 Ascend (1992)
 Kick It (1995)
 I Thought (1995)

Tributes
 Muscle and Hate - Nilaihah Records, (2005)

References

External links

 NITZEREBBPRODUKT - Official website

British electronic body music groups
British industrial music groups
British musical trios
English dance music groups
English techno music groups
English electronic music groups
English new wave musical groups
Geffen Records artists
Musical groups from Essex
Musical groups established in 1982
Musical trios
Mute Records artists
1982 establishments in England
Rhythm King artists